Tomás do Lago Pontes Esteves (born 3 April 2002) is a Portuguese professional footballer who plays as a defender for  club Pisa, on loan from Porto.

Club career
Esteves was born in Arcos de Valdevez, Viana do Castelo District. He was part of the FC Porto squad that won the 2018–19 UEFA Youth League, defeating Chelsea 3–1 in the final in Nyon, Switzerland. With a contract lasting until 2021, he attracted interest from Manchester City who offered €10 million for his signature, and rejected a transfer to FC Barcelona in August 2019.

Ahead of the 2019–20 season, Esteves was given the number 2 shirt for the first team, inherited from the released Maxi Pereira. He made his senior debut on 18 August 2019 for FC Porto B, starting and playing 80 minutes in a 1–1 home draw against Varzim S.C. on the second week of the season.

Esteves had his initial call-up to a first-team matchday squad for the Taça da Liga opening group match against C.D. Santa Clara on 25 September 2019, remaining unused in the 1–0 home win. On 5 December he made his debut in the same competition, playing the last 15 minutes of a 3–0 win at Casa Pia A.C. in place of Wilson Manafá. He made his Primeira Liga bow on 16 June 2020, playing the first hour of a goalless draw at bottom club C.D. Aves before being substituted for Moussa Marega.

On 5 October 2020, Esteves was loaned to EFL Championship club Reading for the season. He made his debut fifteen days later in a 1–0 home win over Wycombe Wanderers, as a 57th-minute substitute for Tom Holmes. He scored his only goal for the Royals in a 2–2 draw with Swansea City on 25 April 2021.

On 2 August 2022, Esteves joined Pisa S.C. in the Italian Serie B on loan with an option to buy and a conditional obligation to buy. He made his debut 11 days later, starting as the season began with a 4–3 loss at A.S. Cittadella.

International career
Esteves first represented Portugal at under-15 level in April 2017. On 5 September 2019, he made his debut for the under-21 team, replacing Thierry Correia at half time in a 5–0 home win over Gibraltar in Alverca in a Euro 2021 qualifier. At 17 years, 5 months and 3 days he became the youngest player for the team in the 21st century, beating fellow Porto graduate Rúben Neves by 25 days.

Personal life
Esteves' younger brother Gonçalo, also a defender, spent a decade at Porto before joining Sporting CP in 2021.

Career statistics

Honours
Porto Youth
UEFA Youth League: 2018–19

Porto
Primeira Liga: 2019–20

References

External links

2002 births
Living people
Portuguese footballers
Portuguese expatriate footballers
People from Arcos de Valdevez
Sportspeople from Viana do Castelo District
Portugal under-21 international footballers
Portugal youth international footballers
Association football defenders
FC Porto players
FC Porto B players
Reading F.C. players
Pisa S.C. players
Primeira Liga players
Liga Portugal 2 players
English Football League players
Serie B players
Portuguese expatriate sportspeople in England
Portuguese expatriate sportspeople in Italy
Expatriate footballers in England
Expatriate footballers in Italy